"Believe" is a song by English musician Elton John. It was the first single from his twenty-fourth studio album, Made in England (1995), and was released on 20 February 1995. Several versions of the single were released, featuring B-sides such as "Circle of Life" from The Lion King and live versions of tracks including "The One", "The Last Song", "Sorry Seems to Be the Hardest Word" and "Believe", which were recorded at the Greek Theatre in Los Angeles.

"Believe" reached number one in Iceland, Italy and Canada, becoming John's 18th number-one single in the latter country. In the United States, "Believe" became John's 15th number one on the Billboard Adult Contemporary chart and peaked at number 13 on the Billboard Hot 100; it gave him his third straight top-20 single in the US. In Europe, it was a top-20 hit in France, Switzerland, the United Kingdom, and the Wallonia region of Belgium.

The accompanying music video for the song was entirely in black-and-white and shot in London, featuring shots of the title screen in the beginning and end of the video.

Critical reception
Dave Sholin from the Gavin Report wrote, "Elton John debuts his resurrected Rocket label with a ballad as compelling as any he's ever recorded. Go directly to the air studio, place in deck, hit play. End of story." Chuck Campbell from Knoxville News Sentinel viewed it as a "plodding single", saying, "This is the formula stuff John's been getting away with for years." British magazine Music Week gave the song four out of five, describing it as "a fab, pompous and brooding "I believe in love" stomper. Thankfully, he's ditched the frothy pop for a quite majestic song that would no doubt get an approving nod from a certain Freddie Mercury." An editor, Alan Jones, felt that "Believe" "is clearly destined to be massive. The big ballad, cleverly marketed over two CD singles, augers well for his upcoming album Made in England." A reviewer from People Magazine described it as "a power ballad that hints at John Lennon during his pop-obsessed Double Fantasy era."

Music video
In the accompanying black-and-white music video for "Believe", directed by Marcus Nispel, Elton John travels around the world in a zeppelin close to the roofs of New York City and London in the middle of one day. Some behind the scenes footage for the video was used for the 1997 documentary Elton John: Tantrums & Tiaras.

Accolades

|-
|1996 || "Believe" || Grammy Award for Best Male Pop Vocal Performance || 
|-

Track listings
 7-inch
 "Believe" – 4:51
 "The One" (live) – 6:32

 Europe CD maxi
 "Believe" – 4:51
 "Believe" (live) – 4:43
 "Sorry Seems to Be the Hardest Word" (live) – 3:52

 US CD maxi
 "Believe" – 4:51
 "The One" (live) – 6:32
 "Believe" (live) – 4:43

Personnel
 Elton John – vocals, piano, keyboards
 Guy Babylon – keyboards, programming
 Bob Birch – bass
 Paul Buckmaster – Orchestra Arrangement, Conductor
 Ray Cooper – percussion
 Davey Johnstone – guitars
 Charlie Morgan – drums

Charts

Weekly charts

Year-end charts

References

1994 songs
1995 singles
Elton John songs
Music videos directed by Marcus Nispel
Number-one singles in Iceland
Number-one singles in Italy
RPM Top Singles number-one singles
Songs with lyrics by Bernie Taupin
Songs with music by Elton John
Rock ballads
The Rocket Record Company singles